The Ministry of Transport was a department of the Government of Spain which existed between 1977 and 1991. The Department was originally named Ministry of Transport and Communications and it was endowed with powers over the postal, telegraphic, radiotelegraphic, telephone and radiotelephone services, the management of all kind of transports (land, air and maritime) and fishery. The fishery powers were transferred to the Ministry of Agriculture in 1980 and the same year the Secretariat of State for Tourism was added to the Ministry. For this reason, the department was renamed Ministry of Transport, Tourism and Communications the following year until its dissolution in 1991.

The Department of Transport was suppressed in March 1991 and most of its competences returned to the Ministry of Public Works. From 1977 to 1991, seven people served as Ministers of Transport.

Organization chart

First period (1977-1981) 
During the first period, the Transport Ministry was integrated by the following bodies:

 The Directorate-General of the Postal Service and Telecommunications.
 The Government Delegation in the National Telephone Company of Spain.
 The Directorate-General for Land Transportation.
 The Undersecretariat of Fisheries and Merchant Marine.
 The Undersecretariat of Civil Aviation.
 The Undersecretariat of Transport and Communications.
 The General Technical Secretariat.

Second period (1981-1991) 
During its second period, the ministry maintained its structure but with some modifications:

 The General Secretariat for Tourism, which was added in 1980.
 The Undersecretariat of Transport and Telecommunications was renamed Undersecretariat of Transport, Tourism and Communications since 1981.

List of Ministers of Transport 
 (1977–1978): José Lladó y Fernández Urrutia
 (1978–1980): Salvador Sánchez-Terán Hernández
 (1980–1981): José Luis Álvarez Álvarez
 (1981–1982): Luis Gámir Casares
 (1982–1985): Enrique Barón Crespo
 (1985–1988): Abel Ramón Caballero Álvarez
 (1988–1991): José Barrionuevo Peña

References

Defunct departments of the Spanish Government
Spain
Ministries established in 1977
1977 establishments in Spain
Ministries disestablished in 1991
1991 disestablishments in Spain